Dr. Sumudu Anopama Atapattu is an international jurist in human rights, environmental and climate change law, and both a Senior Lecturer and Director of Research Centers at the University of Wisconsin Law School. She is an Attorney-at-Law of the Supreme Court of Sri Lanka, an Affiliated Professor at the Raoul Wallenberg Institute in Sweden, and Lead Counsel for Human Rights and Poverty Eradication at the Centre for International Sustainable Development Law.

Education

Atapattu completed her undergraduate studies as an attorney-at-law at the Sri Lanka Law College in Colombo, Sri Lanka. She went on to complete a Master of Law (LLM, First Class Honours) and a Doctor of Philosophy (PhD in International Environmental Law) under the supervision of Sir Christopher Greenwood GBE, QC, from the University of Cambridge.

Professional career 
Atapattu began her academic tenure as an associate professor at the Faculty of Law, University of Colombo teaching international law and environmental law from 1995 to 2002. Concurrently, she worked as a Senior Research Consultant at the human rights NGO the Law & Society trust, and as a consultant for FAO, and UNDP in Colombo. In 2000, she was appointed at a Fulbright Scholar, visiting both New York University School of Law and George Washington University Law School. In 2003, Atapattu was appointed as a Lecturer, later moving to Associate Director and Director of Research Centers, at University of Wisconsin Law School and was appointed Lead Counsel for Lead Counsel for Human Rights and Poverty Eradication at the Centre for International Sustainable Development Law. 

In 2012 Atapattu was awarded the Exceptional Achievement Award by the Sri Lanka Foundation for her contributions to human rights. 

She is also an active speaker on human rights and climate change issues.

Publications

Atapattu has edited or contributed to over 10 books and authored over 70 papers. Representative publications include:

 Legal Aspects of Implementing the Cartagena Protocol on Biosafety (Cambridge University Press, 2013)

 International Environmental Law, Environmental Justice, and the Global South Transnational Law & Contemporary Problems 26:2 (2017), with Carmen C. Gonzalez.
 Human Rights Approaches to Climate Change: Challenges and Opportunities (Routledge, 2015). 
 International Environmental Law and the Global South (Cambridge University Press, 2015), editor with Shawkat Alam, Carmen C. Gonzalez, and Jona Razzaque. 
 Emerging Principles of International Environmental Law (Transnational Publishers, 2006)

References

Year of birth missing (living people)
Living people
Sri Lankan jurists